Ells River is a stream in Alberta, Canada.

Ells River has the name of S. C. Ells, a geologist.

See also
List of rivers of Alberta

References

Rivers of Alberta